Donald or Don Harvey may refer to:

Don Harvey (actor, born 1911) (1911–1963), American TV and film performer a/k/a Don C. Harvey
Don Harvey (basketball) (1920–2008), American guard-forward
Donald P. Harvey (born 1924), U.S. Navy rear admiral and former director of the Office of Naval Intelligence
Don Harvey (bishop) (born 1939), Canadian Anglican moderator and director
Donald Harvey (1952–2017), American hospital orderly and serial killer
Don Harvey (actor, born 1960), American film and TV performer and voice actor